Haddington is a neighborhood in the West Philadelphia section of Philadelphia, Pennsylvania. Its borders are defined as Haverford Avenue/Girard Avenue to the north, 52nd Street to the east, Market Street to the south, and 67th Street to the most western edge of the neighborhood.

History and architectural features
It is a largely African American community of mostly two-story rowhouses with a large proportion of elderly residents and a high home-ownership rate. Near the intersection of Vine Street and 56th Street, new construction and community facilities were built in the 1970s thanks to the Haddington Leadership Organization.

Haddington's Historic District is located on the 6000 blocks of Market, Ludlow, and Chestnut Streets, showcasing colonial and classical revival styles of architecture built from 1909 to 1915. It was listed on the National Register of Historic Places in 1998.

Also listed on the National Register of Historic Places are the George L. Brooks School and Thomas Dunlap School.

Education

The School District of Philadelphia operates public schools.

The Free Library of Philadelphia Haddington Branch serves Haddington.

References

External links
 Haddington Historic District
 West Philadelphia beyond 52nd Street
 Historic Photographs of Haddington, PhillyHistory.org

Neighborhoods in Philadelphia
National Register of Historic Places in Philadelphia
Historic districts in Philadelphia
West Philadelphia
Historic districts on the National Register of Historic Places in Pennsylvania